Étude in D-sharp minor, Op. 8, No. 12, is an étude for piano composed by Alexander Scriabin in 1894. It features many technical challenges, including numerous jumps in the left hand, repetitive chord strikes, and abundant octaves. It is a particular favorite among pianists and audiences alike. This piece was a favorite encore of Vladimir Horowitz.

Technique
The dramatic motive and moving recitative of the solo in the upper voices on the chordal background is characteristic of Scriabin's early creations. The typical tempo for the piece is around 100-112 beats ber minute. The right hand is always playing octaves except for the piece's ending. Similarly, the left hand is continually jumping around until the final chord is struck.

References

External links
 
 Performed by Alexander Scriabin himself, Welte-Mignon piano roll
 A performance by Alfred Cortot

Compositions by Alexander Scriabin
Compositions in D-sharp minor
1894 compositions
Scriabin